Noga Erez is an Israeli singer, songwriter and producer. In 2017, her song "Dance While You Shoot" was used by Apple in an advertising campaign for its music streaming service. In the same year she released her debut album, Off the Radar to critical acclaim. Her second album, Kids, was released in 2021.

Early life
Erez grew up in Caesarea, Israel, from the age of six and was raised Jewish. She studied composition at the Jerusalem Academy of Music and Dance.
Through her childhood and while growing up she explored different instruments and studied different styles of music. Erez was a part of different groups and ensembles as a vocalist, keyboardist and percussionist.

She served as a soldier in an Israel Defence Forces's military band.

Career
In 2011 Erez worked on a jazz album, which she almost finished and decided to scrap and move to writing and producing electronic music.

On stage, Erez performs as a three-piece-band with herself on vocals, Ori Rousso (sampler, synthesizer) and Ran Jacobovitz (electronic drums, percussion).

In 2017, Erez was included in Forbes Israel’s “Under 30” list.

Erez’s first single, “Toy” received a rave review from The New York Times: “the Israeli singer and electronic-music producer Noga Erez gives ‘Toy’ a beat that jitters and heaves, ratchets across the stereo field, speeds up fitfully and stops for a moment of dead silence halfway through the song; the melodies are brief modal phrases hinting at Middle Eastern origins… It’s a sparse, thorny, unstable track — and haunting, too.”

Erez produced her first record “Off the Radar“, which was released 2 June 2017 via City Slang, with her partner Ori Rousso. This release was followed by festival shows at Primavera, SXSW, Pitchfork Paris, Roskilde, MELT! Visions Festival, Convergence and Great Escape in 2017. She also toured the UK and Europe in 2017.

On January 13, 2021, Erez announced her second studio album, ‘’Kids‘’. It was released on March 26, 2021.

On August 31, 2022, Erez collaborated with the rock band Weezer on a remix of the band’s song “Records“.

On September 16, 2022 Erez collaborated with the american rapper Missy Eliott on a remix of the Erez’s song “NAILS”.

On the 16th and 17th of September 2022, Erez was the opening act for the British band Florence and the Machine at Madison Square Garden.

Influences

Erez's musical style draws influences from alternative, electronic music, and sample-based hip hop, but is also strongly influenced by political circumstances both in her country and globally, though she has been reticent to describe her work as political.  In an interview with The Guardian, Erez describes her songs as her way to “process the issues that bother me about the world”. Her music also references her musical influences such as Flying Lotus, Björk, Frank Ocean or Kendrick Lamar. With a mix of drum computers, synthesizers, and vocals she describes the chaos in the environment she grew up with, through bass-heavy and danceable tunes.

Discography

Studio albums
 Off the Radar (2017)
 Kids (2021)

Singles
 "Toy" (2017)
 "Sunshine" (2018)
 "Bad Habits" (2018)
 "Cash Out" (2018)
 "Chin Chin" with Echo (2019)
 "Views" featuring Reo Cragun & Rousso (2020)
 "No News on TV" (2020)
 "You So Done" (2020)
 "End of the Road" (2021)
 "Story" (2021)
 "Knockout (Against the Machine)" (2021)
 "The "A" in Amazing" (2021)
 "Industry Baby" (2022) (Cover of the Lil Nas X song of the same name)
 "NAILS" (2022)
 "NAILS (feat. Missy Eliott)" (2022)

Music videos

Awards and nominations

References

External links
 
 
 
 
 
 https://www.pastemagazine.com/articles/2017/05/noga-erez-off-the-radar-review.html
 http://diymag.com/2017/10/17/noga-erez-new-video-balkada-watch

Israeli women singer-songwriters
1989 births
Living people
English-language singers from Israel
21st-century Israeli women singers
Israeli pop singers
People from Caesarea, Israel
City Slang artists
Israeli Jews
Atlantic Records artists